Pether is a surname. Notable people with the surname include:

Abraham Pether (1756–1812), British painter
Henry Pether (1800–1880), British painter
Henry E. Pether (1867–1932), British songwriter
Sebastian Pether (1790–1844), British painter
Stewart Pether (1916-2010), British cricketer and schoolmaster

English-language surnames